KRI Sampari (628) is a  of the Indonesian Navy. Built by PT PAL, she is the lead ship in her class.

Characteristics
At full charge, it has a draft of 2.6 m, and the ship's displacement is 460 tonnes.

She is armed with the Chinese-manufactured version of the AK-630 (NG-18) CIWS, the Bofors 40mm as main gun, and Yugoimport-SDPR M71/08 20mm cannon as secondary gun.

Service history
Sampari was commissioned on 28 May 2014, as the first ship of her class. In late 2017, Sampari'''s missile-launching capabilities was removed, but the decision was reversed and the missiles were reinstalled.

In August 2019, Sampari'' participated in the Cooperation Afloat Readiness and Training exercise with KRI Sultan Iskandar Muda and KRI Nala, alongside U.S. Navy vessels USS Montgomery, USS Fall River, and USCGC Stratton.

References

2014 ships
Sampari-class fast attack craft